Martin Wiggemansen (7 June 1957 – 19 August 2021) was a Dutch professional footballer who played as a left winger.

Club career
Born in Amsterdam, Wiggemansen played for FC Amsterdam, Ajax, Lugano and PEC Zwolle.

He joined Ajax in 1980 from FC Amsterdam and played 24 games for the senior side, scoring on his Eredivisie debut against Roda JC. Lured to Ajax by the club's directors, he was not wanted by Ajax manager Leo Beenhakker and Wiggemansen left the club after losing his place to Danish talent Jesper Olsen.

He scored a table-toppping 19 goals for FC Lugano in the Swiss second tier-Nationalliga B in the 1983/84 season, after scoring 13 in his first season with the club.

International career
He also played for the Netherlands at under-21 youth level in a game against Hungary in May 1978.

Post-playing career
After retiring as a player, he worked for Ajax as a youth coach. He also worked as a consultant for an insurance company.

Personal life

Death
Wiggemansen died of cancer in 2021. He was survived by his wife Ellie and their two children.

References

1957 births
2021 deaths
Footballers from Amsterdam
Association football wingers
Dutch footballers
Netherlands under-21 international footballers
FC Amsterdam players
AFC Ajax players
FC Lugano players
PEC Zwolle players
Eredivisie players
Swiss Challenge League players
Dutch expatriate footballers
Expatriate footballers in Switzerland
Dutch expatriate sportspeople in Switzerland
Association football coaches
AFC Ajax non-playing staff